La Doriclea is a 1681 opera by Alessandro Stradella. The manuscript was lost, rediscovered in 1938, then lost again until its recent re-discovery.

Cast
Doriclea (soprano) 
Delfina (soprano) 
Lucinda (soprano) 
Fidalbo (countertenor) 
Celindo (tenor)
Giraldo (bass)

Recordings
La Doriclea, Emőke Baráth Il Pomo d'Oro, conducted by Andrea De Carlo, Arcana

References

Operas
1681 operas
Operas by Alessandro Stradella